Gustavo Milano, (born 11 February 1961 in Rosario) is a former Argentine rugby union footballer, coach and sports agent. He played as lock and was an international for Argentina and for Italy.

Career
Hailing from Jockey Club Rosario, he played in the club and in the Argentina as lock: debuting for the Pumas in 1982, during the End of the year test against France, at Toulouse.
He played and won the South America Rugby Championship in 1985 and 1987, as well, he took part at the 1987 Rugby World Cup, playing only the match against Fiji.
In 1989, Milano moved to Italy, playing for San Donà and the UAR excluded him from the national team, as usual with the players who moved abroad at the time.
Moving to Milan, he won three scudetti and -as coach- he qualified to the 1994 final lost against L'Aquila: unusually, the following season he returned in the field as player-coach.
Retiring definitively in 1996, he remained in rugby as coach, then as agent for Argentinian rugby players in the European market; since 2002 he is the director in charge of the training skills for the UAR.

Notes

External links

1961 births
Living people
Argentine rugby union players
Rugby union locks
Sportspeople from Santa Fe Province
Argentina international rugby union players
Italy international rugby union players
Argentine people of Italian descent